Khadzhyder Lagoon is a salty lagoon in the Tuzly Lagoons group in Tatarbunary Raion of Odessa Oblast, Ukraine. It is separated from the Alibey by a sandbar. Two river, Khadzhyder River and Hlyboka River, inflow into the lagoon. The last one inflows west to the village Bezymyanka, it has a length 24 km, watershed area 80.3 km2. The lagoon has a 4 km length and 2.5 km width. Two villages, Lyman and Bezymyanka, are located on the coast of the lagoon.

The lagoon was a part of the Alibey Lagoon in historical period, and appeared as a result of separation of the Khadzhyder River mouth by a sandbar. Several kurhans of Catacomb culture are located near the village of Lyman.

The water body is included to the Tuzly Lagoons National Nature Park.

Hydronym 
«The valley of Hajji»
 Hajj, Hajj  ( hajj) is an Islamic pilgrimage.
 Dere

The name of the lagoon Khadzhyder  on the historical maps:
 1877 — .

Sources

Tuzly Lagoons